The Ship Who Searched is a science fiction novel by American writers Anne McCaffrey and Mercedes Lackey. It is the third of seven books in The Ship Who Sang series by McCaffrey and four other authors, and the only one by Lackey. It was first published as a serial in the monthly Amazing Stories, June to September, and as a paperback original by Baen Books in August 1992.

The Ship Who Searched follows the adventures of Hypatia Cade, whom an alien virus renders quadriplegic. Her only hope for a good life, free of the prison her body has become, is to enter the BB Program, named for Brain and Brawn. She does so, and becomes a brainship, a cyborg human being and interstellar spacecraft. The book begins when she contracts the virus at age seven and features her adventures as AH-1033 with her "brawn" Alex, the human partner whom she secretly loves.

Premise
Hypatia or AH-1033 is unique among protagonists of the Brain & Brawn Ship series in that she is disabled as a child rather than at birth. The premise introducing the series is that the parents of babies with severe physical disabilities but fully developed brains may allow them to become "shell people" rather than to be euthanised. Taking that option, physical growth is stunted, the body is encapsulated in a titanium life-support shell with capacity for computer connections, and the person is raised for "one of a number of curious professions. As such, their offspring would suffer no pain, live a comfortable existence in a metal shell for several centuries, performing unusual service for Central Worlds".
 
Shell children do come of age with heavy debts which they must work off in order to become free agents. They are employed as the "brains" of spacecraft "brainships", hospitals, and so on, even cities. A brainship is able to operate independently but is usually employed in partnership with one "normal" person called a "brawn" who travels inside the ship much as a pilot would. A brawn is specially trained to be a companion and helper, the mobile half of such a partnership. The nickname is relative: the training is long and intense and the brawns must be brainy people in fact.

Criticism
The Ship Who Searched is the specific reference for "The Future Imperfect" by disability rights advocate Sarah Einstein, a critique of the Brain & Brawn Ship series representing science fiction and modern convention in general. Einstein observes that 40 years later they have 

The essay serves as a call for reader-submitted stories that incorporate its values. Einstein concludes:

References

External links 
 

1992 American novels
Novels by Anne McCaffrey
1992 science fiction novels
Sequel novels
Works originally published in Amazing Stories
Novels first published in serial form
Brain–computer interfacing in fiction